Tatums is a historic Freedmen's town in Carter County, Oklahoma, United States. The population was 151 at the 2010 census, a decline of 12.2 percent from the figure of 172 in 2000. It is part of the Ardmore, Oklahoma Micropolitan Statistical Area.

Geography

History
According to the Encyclopedia of Oklahoma History and Culture, Tatums was founded in Indian Territory in 1895 by Lee and Mary Tatum, though Oklahoma Place Names states that the town was not incorporated until May 9, 1896, And a hotel was built in 1899, a blacksmith shop in 1900,a cotton gin and sawmill in 1910, and a motor garage in 1918.Oil wells were drilled in the area in the 1920s,bringing wealth to several of Tatums's farmers and landowners. 

At the time of its founding, Tatums was located in Pickens County, Chickasaw Nation.

The town was one of more than fifty all-black towns founded in Oklahoma, and is one of thirteen still in existence. Lee Tatum was the first postmaster, ran a grocery store, and was a U.S. Marshal. Travelers who came through Tatums could stay at the home of Henry Taylor, who owned the largest home in town. Over the next few decades, other businesses were added to the town, including a church, school, hotel, blacksmith shop, a cotton gin and sawmill, and a motor garage.  In the 1920s, oil wells were drilled around Tatums, and several residents richly profited from them.

A brick school funded by the Rosenwald Fund was completed in 1926. In 1927, Norman Studios filmed a silent movie, Black Gold, in Tatums. Marshal L. B. Tatums played a role in the film. No copy of the film is known to exist, but the script and camera are held by the Autry National Center in California.

The Great Depression greatly damaged Tatums' economy, so many residents migrated to urban areas. Amid the Depression, the Works Progress Administration built a new brick school in 1936.

The Bethel Missionary Baptist Church, completed in 1919, is an historic Baptist church in Tatums, and is included on the NRHP listings for Carter County.

Demographics

As of the 2010 United States Census, there were 151 people, 68 households, and 45 families residing in the town.  The racial makeup of the town was 79.5% African American, 4.6% White, 8.6% Native American, and 7.3% from two or more races. Hispanic or Latino of any race were 3.3% of the population.

There were 68 households, out of which 19.1% had children under the age of 18 living with them, 27.9% were married couples living together, 26.5% had a female householder with no husband present, and 33.8% were non-families. 33.8% of all households were made up of individuals, and 32.4% had someone living alone who was 65 years of age or older. The average household size was 2.22 and the average family size was 2.64.

The population was spread out, with 18.5% under the age of 18, 6.0% from 18 to 24, 20.5% from 25 to 44, 37.7% from 45 to 64, and 17.2% who were 65 years of age or older. The median age was 48.8 years. For every 100 females, there were 115.7 males. For every 100 females age 18 and over, there were 95.2 males.

According to the 2013 American Community Survey, The median income for a household in the town was $21,083, and the median income for a family was $21,500. The per capita income for the town was $10,509. About 25.0% of families and 37.8% of the population were below the poverty line, including 77.8% of those under the age of 18 and 35.7% of those 65 or over.

See also
 Boley, Brooksville, Clearview, Grayson, Langston, Lima, Redbird, Rentiesville, Summit, Taft, Tullahassee, and Vernon, other "All-Black" settlements that were part of the Land Run of 1889.

References

Towns in Carter County, Oklahoma
Towns in Oklahoma
Ardmore, Oklahoma micropolitan area
Populated places in Oklahoma established by African Americans
Pre-statehood history of Oklahoma